Overrun! is a 1989 computer wargame designed by Gary Grigsby and published by Strategic Simulations.

Gameplay
Overrun! is a computer wargame that simulates historical and hypothetical conflicts from 1973 onward.

Development
Overrun! was designed by Gary Grigsby and released in 1989. It is based on the game engine and mechanics of Grigsby's earlier Typhoon of Steel, itself adapted from his game Panzer Strike. Grigsby revised the system to support modern warfare scenarios; the previous games had been set during World War II.

Reception

In Computer Gaming World, Buddy Knight wrote, "All things taken together, Overrun! gives you your money's worth. I would heartily recommend buying a copy." Erik Olson of Compute!'s Gazette was similarly positive toward the game: he dubbed it "possibly the most complex war game available for the 64" and "an excellent simulation". Zzap!s Robin Hogg wrote that it "[s]lips up in the possibilities of modern combat but despite this [is] an extensive and very comprehensive wargame."

References

External links

1989 video games
Amiga games
Apple II games
Commodore 64 games
Computer wargames
Strategic Simulations games
Video games developed in the United States
World War II video games